Neyzi is a Turkish surname. Notable people with the surname include:

 Leyla Neyzi (born 1961), Turkish academic anthropologist, sociologist and historian
 Olcay Neyzi (1927–2022), Turkish doctor, mother of Leyla

Turkish-language surnames